Philippine Division, or from 1946–1947 the 12th Infantry Division, was the core U.S. infantry division of the United States Army's Philippine Department during World War II. On 31 July 1941, the division consisted of 10,473 troops, mostly enlisted Filipinos, known as the Philippine Scouts who formed the 45th and 57th US Infantry Regiments. All of the division's enlisted men, with the exception of the 31st Infantry Regiment, and various military police and headquarters troops, were Philippine Scouts.

In October 1941, as part of the U.S. Army Forces Far East, plans were made to "triangularize" the division. The 34th Infantry was detached from the 8th Infantry Division and moved to a port of embarkation in December 1941, along with two battalions of 105mm field artillery. The Philippine Division was to have two complete U.S. regimental combat teams in place by January 1942 to provide General Douglas MacArthur with a modern, trained mobile reaction force, while freeing up Philippine Scouts for rounding out other units. The outbreak of war in December 1941, however, isolated the Philippines and prevented implementation of the plan.

Shoulder sleeve insignia
Description: On a scarlet spade-shaped shield, a yellow carabao's head caboshed.
Symbolism: The carabao is suggestive of the Philippines, and the colors red and gold represent the Spanish heritage of the islands.

Organization (July 1941)
Headquarters and Headquarters Company, Philippine Division (181)
Headquarters, Special Troops, Philippine Division (5)
12th Military Police Company (PS) (136)
12th Ordnance Company (PS) (142)
12th Signal Company (PS) (227)
31st Infantry Regiment (2,131)
43rd Infantry Regiment (PS) (329)
1st Battalion only element active
45th Infantry Regiment (PS) (2,265)
57th Infantry Regiment (PS) (2,279)
23d Field Artillery Regiment (PS) (401) (QF 2.95-inch mountain gun)
24th Field Artillery Regiment (PS) (843) (M1917 75mm gun)
14th Engineer Regiment (PS) (870)
12th Medical Regiment (PS) (421)
12th Quartermaster Regiment (PS) (592
4th Veterinary Company (PS) (11)

Lineage
Constituted 7 December 1921 in the Regular Army as Headquarters, Philippine Division.
Organized 10 April 1922 in the Philippine Islands, with Regular Army and Philippine Scouts personnel.
Surrendered 9 April 1942 to the Japanese 14th Army.
Redesignated 6 April 1946 as the 12th Infantry Division.
Inactivated 30 April 1947 in the Philippine Islands.
Disbanded 23 March 1953.

Combat chronicle

Units of the Philippine Division were on security missions at Manila, Fort William McKinley, and Bataan prior to the declaration of war in the Pacific, 8 December 1941. After undergoing 2 days of bombings, the Division moved into the field to cover the withdrawal of troops to Bataan and to resist the enemy in the Subic Bay area. From 11 December 1941 to 23 December 1941, positions were organized and strengthened and on 23 December 1941 the Division was assigned to the Bataan Defense Forces. While the 31st Infantry Regiment moved to the vicinity of Zig Zag Pass to cover the flanks of troops withdrawing from central and southern Luzon, 30 December 1941, the rest of the Division organized the main and reserve positions on Bataan. The 31st Infantry Regiment moved to a defensive position on the west side of the Olongapo Road near Layac Junction, 5 January 1942. This junction was lost on 6 January 1942, but the withdrawal to Bataan had been successfully concluded.
The Division was placed in reserve from 7 January 1942 to 14 January 1942. This period was largely one of reconnaissance and development by the Japanese in preparation for their attack on the main battle position on the Abucay line. Elements repulsed night attacks near Abucay on 10 January 1942 – 12 January 1942, and other elements of the Division counterattacked on 16 January 1942. Strong offensive and defensive action was not able to prevent enemy penetrations and the Division withdrew to the Reserve Battle Position in the Pilar – Bagac area, 2 February 1942. Until the latter part of March the enemy, made cautious by heavy losses, engaged in patrols and limited local attacks, and after a general retirement, 24 March 1942, did not undertake any serious activity on this front until 28 March 1942. During this period elements of the Division were shifted to assist in the defense of other sectors. The enemy attack on 28 March struck at a division weakened by malnutrition, sickness, and prolonged exposure to combat. The Division, no longer operating as a coordinated unit, was unable to counterattack against heavy enemy assaults.
On 8 April 1942, the 57th Infantry Regiment and the 31st Infantry Regiment were lost near the Alangan River, and the 45th Infantry Regiment surrendered, 10 April 1942.

Wartime assignments
U.S. Army Forces in the Far East (USAFFE) – 8 December 1941 – 24 December 1941.
Bataan Defense Force – 24 December 1941 – 6 January 1942.
U.S. Army Forces in the Far East (USAFFE) – 6 January 1942 – 26 January 1942.
II Philippine Corps – 26 January 1942 – 7 April 1942.
I Philippine Corps – 7 April 1942 – 10 April 1942.
 Prisoner of War Captivity – 10 April 1942 – 1945

Miscellaneous
The regimental colors of the 12th Quartermaster Regiment (PS) were given to an Army nurse (one of the "Angels of Bataan and Corregidor") by the regimental commander. Upon her capture she told the Japanese that it was "only a shawl" and kept it safe throughout more than three years of captivity. Today, the colors are on display at the U.S. Army Quartermaster Museum, Fort Lee, Virginia.

Commanders
MG Omar Bundy (April 1922 – March 1924)
MG Douglas MacArthur (March 1924 – January 1925)
MG William Weigel (January 1925 – February 1927)
MG Frank M. Caldwell (February 1927 - April 1927)
MG Johnson Hagood (April 1927 - June 1929)
MG Paul B. Malone (June 1929 - June 1931)
BG Casper H. Conrad Jr. (June 1931 - July 1933)
BG Frank S. Cocheu (July 1933 - May 1935)
BG Stanley H. Ford (May 1935 - May 1935)
BG Alfred T. Smith (June 1935 - January 1937)
BG Evan H. Humphrey (January 1937 - January 1937)
BG John L. DeWitt (January 1937 - April 1937)
BG George Grunert (April 1937 - July 1937)
MG John H. Hughes (July 1937 - February 1938)
MG Percy P. Bishop (February 1938 - October 1938)
MG Walter S. Grant (October 1938 – July 1939)
BG Henry C. Pratt (July 1939 - November 1939)
MG George Grunert (November 1939 – May 1940)
MG Henry C. Pratt (May 1940 - November 1940)
MG Jonathan M. Wainwright IV (November 1940 – December 1941)
BG Maxon S. Lough (December 1941 – May 1942)

Honors

Campaign participation credit

Decorations

Unit awards

Personal awards
Medals of Honor: 3.

Bibliography

See also
Charles C. Drake
Battle of the Philippines (1941–42)
Divisions of the United States Army
Military History of the Philippines
Military History of the United States

References

External links
The United States Army Quartermaster Museum

Military history of the Philippines during World War II
Infantry divisions of the United States Army
United States Army divisions during World War II
Military units and formations established in 1921
Military units and formations disestablished in 1947